Last Communion is a novel by Nicholas Yermakov published in 1981.

Plot summary
Last Communion is a novel in which an alien invades a human mind.

Reception
Greg Costikyan reviewed Last Communion in Ares Magazine #12 and commented that "Last Communion is not a bad novel, but a disappointing one. Yermakov remains an author to keep an eye on."

Reviews
Review by Tom Staicar (1982) in Amazing Science Fiction Stories, March 1982 
Review by Tom Easton (1982) in Analog Science Fiction/Science Fact, March 1, 1982

References

1981 novels